Several thousand place names in the United States have names of French origin, some a legacy of past French exploration and rule over much of the land and some in honor of French help during the American Revolution and the founding of the country (see also: New France and French in the United States). Others were named after early Americans of French, especially Huguenot, ancestry (Marion, Revere, Fremont, Lanier, Sevier, Macon, Decatur, etc.). Some places received their names as a consequence of French colonial settlement (e.g. Baton Rouge, Detroit, New Orleans, Saint Louis). Nine state capitals are French words or of French origin (Baton Rouge, Boise, Des Moines, Juneau, Montgomery, Montpelier, Pierre, Richmond, Saint Paul) - not even counting Little Rock (originally "La Petite Roche") or Cheyenne (a French rendering of a Lakota word). Fifteen state names are either French words / origin (Delaware, New Jersey, Louisiana, Maine, Oregon, Vermont) or Native American words rendered by French speakers (Arkansas, Illinois, Iowa, Kansas, Michigan, Mississippi, Ohio, Wisconsin). 

The suffix "-ville," from the French word for "city" is common for town and city names throughout the United States. Many originally French place names, possibly hundreds, in the Midwest and Upper West were replaced with directly translated English names once American settlers became locally dominant (e.g. "La Petite Roche" became Little Rock; "Baie Verte" became Green Bay; "Grandes Fourches" became Grand Forks).

Alabama
Albertville
Barbour County
Bay Minette ("Kitty Bay" or "Cute Bay")
Bayou la Batre ("Bayou of the Battery")
Belle Fontaine ("Beautiful Fountain")
Belle Mina
Bon Air ("Good Air")
Bon Secour ("Good Rescue")
Centreville (City-center, or Downtown. Note the "re" spelling of centre, as opposed to "er" as in center)
Citronelle (named after the citrus trees.)
Daphne
Dauphin Island (named after the Dauphin, French crown prince) 
DeArmanville
Decatur
Decatur County
Delchamps
Detroit
Fayette County
Gasque 
Grande Batture Islands
Isle aux Dames (Island of the ladies)
Isle aux Herbes (Island of the herbs)
LaFayette
Lamar County
Le Moyne (The Monk, old spelling)
Leroy
Malbis
Marion (named after Francis Marion, patriot of the American Revolution and of Huguenot ancestry)
Mentone
Mobile (French name for the indigenous Mauvilla tribe)
Mobile County
Mon Louis
Montrose
Semmes

Alaska
La Chaussée Spit at the entrance of Lituya Bay. Named originally in charts prepared by French explorer Jean-François de La Pérouse in 1786. La Chaussée means "causeway".
Mount La Pérouse (3231 m) and La Pérouse Glacier in the Fairweather Range of Alaska, both named after French explorer and naval captain Jean-François de Galaup, comte de La Pérouse
Gastineau Channel named after John Gastineau, an English Civil Engineer and Surveyor with a French surname. Compare with Gatineau.
Juneau named after Joseph Juneau, French-Canadian prospector and gold miner

Arizona
Clemenceau (Named after the French prime minister during World War I)
Picket Wire (Corruption of the French Purgatoire, "Purgatory")
Peridot

Arkansas
Arkansas  (named by French explorers from aboriginal word meaning "south wind")
Antoine ("Anthony")
Aurelle
Auvergne (a French region)
Barraque Township
Bayou
Bayou Meto, Arkansas County, Arkansas
Bayou Meto, Lonoke County, Arkansas
Beauchamp (fair of beautiful field or plain)
Beaudry
Belleaire (from "belle aire", beautiful place)
Belleville  ("Beautiful City")
Bellefonte (maybe from "belle fontaine", beautiful fountain)
Boeuf ("Beef")
Bonair (good air)
Buie
Burdette
Cache
Cadron
Calumet The French word for a Native American tobacco pipe.
Calvin (Anglicized version of Cauvin, famous French Protestant)
Champagnolle
Chancel
Chicot County (a stump)
Claude
Cloquet
Darcy
De Roche (of the rock)
Deberrie
Decatur
Delaplaine (Of-the-plains, surname)
Departee
Devue
Des Arc ("At the bend")
Dumas (French surname)
Ecore Fabre
Fayetteville (named for French general, Marquis de La Fayette)
Fontaine ("Fountain", a surname)
Fourche ("Pitchfork")
Fourche Lafave
Fourche Valley
Francure
Frenchman's Bayou
Gallatin
Grand Glaise ("Large Clay")
Gravette
La Fave
La Grue (the crane)
La Grue Springs
Lacrosse
Ladelle
Lafayette County
LaGrange ("the barn")
Lamartine (French author Alphonse de Lamartine, also a surname)
L'Anguille ("The Eel")
Lapile
Larue (the street)
Latour (the tower)
Lave Creek
Levesque ("Bishop", a common French-Canadian surname)
Macon (French city "Mâcon")
Marais Saline (saline marsh)
Marche
Maumee
Maumelle (breasts)
Monette
Mont Sandels
Montreal (royal mount)
Moreau (feedbag, probably a family's proper name)
Mount Magazine
New Gascony (Gascony)
Ozark (phonetic rendering of either aux Arks, "of the Ark(ansas)" or aux Arcs, "of the arches", or possibly aux arcs-en-ciel, "of the rainbows")
Ozark Mountains as per immediately above
Paris
Paroquet
Partain
Petit Jean  ("Little John" named after a French sailor on the Arkansas River)
Pollard
Prairie County ("prairie, meadow")
Sans Souci (literally without concern)
Segur (French city)
Sevier County
Smackover (Anglicization of chemin couvert, "covered way")
Soudan
St. Francis County
Terre Noire  (black earth)
Terre Rouge  (redland or red earth)
Tollette
Tully
Urbanette
Vallier (French surname)
Vaucluse (French region)
Vaugine Township
Vidette
Villemont (ville = city, mont = mount)

California
Alsace (Region in France bordering Germany)
Artois (named after Artois, France)
Bel Air ("Beautiful Air")
Belfort ("Beautiful Fort")
Belmont ("Beautiful Mount")
Bonnefoy ("Good Faith")
Cassel (a town in France)
Chalfant
Delano (after a scion of the famous Delano Family, originally Huguenots named "De Lannoye")
Disneyland (after Walt Disney, a descendant of the Norman family d'Isigny (Isigny, Normandie, France))
Fremont (named for John C. Frémont, American soldier, explorer and politician of French ancestry)
Friant
Gasquet
Guerneville
Lafayette (named for the French general Marquis de La Fayette)
La Grange ("The Barn")
La Grange Reservoir
La Porte ("The door")
La Verne 
Lebec (Le bec = "the beak")
Le Grand ("The Big")
Montague (pointed hill)
Montclair ("Clear Mountain")
Nice (After French city of the same name)
Nord ("North")
Orleans
Rubidoux (named for Louis Rubidoux)
Mount Rubidoux
San Francisco (named after Saint Francis of Assisi, who had received that name because his mother was French or as a tribute to France)
Vichy Springs (After French city of the same name)

Colorado
Ault
Bellevue ("Beautiful Sight" or View")
Berthoud
Berthoud Pass and town of Berthoud
Bethune (Maybe from Maximilien de Béthune, also a place)nghn
Bijou Creek (from bijoux meaning "jewel")
Cache La Poudre River ("hide the powder" or "powder cache")
Calumet See Arkansas
De Beque
Florissant (from "flowering")
Fremont County
Grand County
Lafayette
Lamar
Laporte ("The Door", a common French Canadian surname)
La Salle ("The Room", surname)
Louisville (city of Louis, king of France)
Louviers
Lyons (a city in France)
Montclair ("Bright or "Clear Mountain")
Montrose (Rose-mount)
Montrose County
North and South Platte Rivers
Parachute
Parachute Creek
Platteville
Poudre Park
Purgatoire River
St. Vrain Creek
Sublette
Vernon

Connecticut
Ballouville
Montville
Pomfret Landing
Versailles
Versailles Pond in New London County

Delaware
Delaware named after Lord de la Warre (Anglo-Norman surname originally de la Guerre meaning; "of the war")
Bellefonte (beautiful fountain)
Bellevue

Florida
Barrineau Park
Bayou George
Belandville (failed "colony" in northern Santa Rosa County, approximately one mile south of its border with Escambia County, Alabama)
Belle Glade ("beautiful" glade)
Belle Isle 
Brevard County
Clermont
Destin ("destiny")
DuPuis Reserve
Duval County (named for William Pope DuVal)
Eau Gallie ("rocky water")
Fort Caroline
Fontainebleau
LaBelle ("The Beauty", "The Beautiful" or "Beautiful Woman")
Lafayette County
Lake Lorraine
Marion County
Navarre (Navarre)
Navarre Beach
Port Saint Lucie (Lucie is French for Lucy)
Ribault River (named for Jean Ribault leader of the Huguenot colony Fort Caroline in early Florida whose inhabitants were massacred by the Spanish)

Georgia
Beaulieu ("pretty place")
Berrien County
Decatur
Decatur County
Fannin County
Fayette County
LaGrange ("The Barn", named for the French Estate of Marquis de Lafayette)
Lanier County
Macon ("mason")
Valdosta (named after the French-speaking region of Val d'Aoste in the Italian Alps)

Hawai'i
Fort DeRussy (named for General René Edward De Russy and his brother Lewis, soldiers of Huguenot ancestry)
French Frigate Shoals
La Pérouse Bay named after Jean-François de Galaup, Comte de La Pérouse, first European to visit the island of Maui
La Pérouse Pinnacle located in the French Frigate Shoals, Hawai'i

Idaho
Arbon
Bellevue ("Beautiful View")
Blanchard (French surname)
Boise (from boisé, "Wooded")
Bonneville County (named after Benjamin Louis Eulalie de Bonneville (1796–1878), a French-born officer in the United States Army, fur trapper and explorer)
Bovard
Bruneau (French surname)
Cache ("hidden")
Coeur d'Alene ("Heart of the Awl")
Culdesac ("Dead End")
Dubois  ("of the wood")
Fremont County
Grandjean
Grangeville  ("barn city")
Jacques
Labelle
Laclede
La Fleur ("the Flower")
Malad City (from malade, French for "sick")
Michaud (French surname from Michel (Michael))
Montour
Montpelier
Nez Perce County (from the Nez Perce Tribe's name "nez percé" meaning "pierced nose")
Paris
Payette (named after François Payette)
Pierre's Hole
Ponderay (from pend oreille, "earring")
Simplot
St. Maries
Teton ("Teat")
Thiard

Illinois
Illinois, French version of Illini, a local Native American tribe
Illinois River
Beaucoup Creek (plenty good)
Belle Rive ("Beautiful Bank") (French military commander)
Belleville ("Beautiful City")
Bonpas Creek ("Good Step")
Bourbonnais (named for François Bourbonnais, Sr., a fur trader)
Bureau County ("Office"; person's name)
Cache River (hidden river)
Champaign (from Champaigne, a French surname)
Chicago, although not a French place name in itself, shikaakwa or "wild onion" in the Native-American Miami-Illinois language, the pronunciation of the "chi" (as opposed to the "chi" as in China) is the result of early French settlement
Creve Coeur ("Heartbreak"; early French fort)
Decatur
DePue (named for an early French fur trader by the name of De Pue)
Des Plaines ("of the Plains")
Des Plaines River
Du Bois (from the woods)
DuPage River
Du Quoin (name of an Illiniwek chief)
Embarrass ("Predicament")
Fayette County (after LaFayette)
Fort Massac
Hennepin (named in honor of the 17th-century French explorer Father Louis Hennepin)
Joliet (named after explorer Louis Jolliet)
La Fayette
La Grange ("The Barn")
La Moille
La Moine River ("The Monk", after an early monastery)
La Salle (named after explorer René-Robert Cavelier, Sieur de La Salle. La Salle literally means "the Hall.")
L'erable, Illinois (Settled by French Canadians)
Libertyville
Marion
Marseilles (after Marseille)
Massac (French Minister)
Menard County (after Pierre Menard)
Prairie du Rocher ("Prairie of the Rock")
Paris
Rochelle
St. Anne (Anne is spelled in French. Founded by French-speaking Canadians.  See Charles Chiniquy)
St. Georges (Note: retains the silent "s" from the French)
Sublette
Toulon
Versailles (for the French city and palace)

Indiana
Bourbon
Clermont
Decatur
Decatur County
Delaware County
De Motte ("the mound")
Dubois County
Dunkirk
Fayette
Fayette County
Ferdinand
Fremont
French Lick
Fugit
Jay County
La Crosse
La Fontaine
La Porte (named by French explorers travelling up from the south, this area was the first clearing or "door" out of the heavy woods to the south.)
La Porte County
Lafayette (named for the French general, Marquis de Lafayette)
LaGrange County
Ligonier
Marion County
Montpelier
Napoleon
Notre Dame ("Our Lady")
Orleans
Portage
Saint Croix
Saint Leon, Indiana
St. Paul
Sedan
Terre Haute ("High Ground")
Vernon
Versailles
Vevay
Vincennes (named for François Marie Bissot, Sieur de Vincennes)

Iowa
Audubon
Belle Plaine
Belleville
Bellevue
Belmond
Belmont
Bennezette
Bonaparte
Bondurant
Boyer
Chariton
Couler Valley ("To Flow," also namesake for the Couler Creek)
Clutier
Decatur City
Decatur County
Des Moines  (from Rivière des Moines, "River of the Monks", the river flowing through the city)
Dubuque (named after explorer Julien Dubuque)
Durant (French surname)
Fayette (town and county, named after the French Marquis de LaFayette who served in the Revolutionary War)
Fontanelle
Fort de la Trinité
Fremont
Giard, Iowa
Lafayette
La Grange ("The Barn")
La Motte
La Porte ("The Door")
Le Claire
Le Grand ("The Great")
Le Mars ("March")
Le Roy ("The King")
Lyons, Iowa (named after the French city, Lyon)
Marion, Iowa (named after Francis Marion, Revolutionary War hero of a S. Carolinian French Huguenot family)
Marquette
Martelle
Mondamin
Montpelier
Muscatine
Orleans (French city of Orléans)
Paris
Platte
Prairie
Rinard
Tête des Morts ("Head of the Dead Ones")

Kansas
Belleville
Belle Plaine
Bourbon County
Decatur County
La Cygne ("The Swan"; after the Marais des Cygnes River, which was named by French explorers)
Labette County, named after Pierre La Bette, an early settler of French origin
Lecompton
LeLoup "The Wolf"
Marais des Cygnes River
Marion County
Reno County, named after Major General Jesse Lee Reno, a Union officer killed in the American Civil War. (Reno's family name was a modified version of the French surname "Renault".)
St. Francis
Sedan
Sublette, Kansas
Toulon (most likely named for the French city)
Wyandotte County, French spelling of the name of an Indian tribe who were also known as the Hurons by the French in Canada

Kentucky
Cities
Bellefonte
Bellemeade
Bellevue ("Beautiful Sight")
La Center
La Grange
LaFayette
Louisville (named in honor of King Louis XVI in 1778)
Paris
Versailles

Counties
Bourbon County (name for House of Bourbon, European Royal House)
Fayette County (named for Gilbert du Motier, Marquis de La Fayette)
Gallatin County (named for Albert Gallatin, Swiss American and Secretary of State)
LaRue County (named for John LaRue, early Kentucky settler)
Marion County (named for Francis Marion, a hero of the American Revolution of French Huguenot ancestry)

Louisiana
Louisiana (Louisiane in French - named in honor of King Louis XIV of France in 1682)
Abbeville (after Abbeville, France) (One of several communities in the United States named "Abbeville".)
Algiers New Orleans neighborhood
Ascension Parish, named from the French l'Ascension
Arnaudville
Assumption Parish, named from the French l'Assomption
Audubon New Orleans neighborhood
Avoyelles Parish
Baton Rouge ("Red Stick")
Bayou Cane
Bayou Chicot
Bayou Gauche ("Left Bayou")
Bayou Grande Cheniere Mounds
Bayou L'Ourse
Beauregard Parish
Belle Alliance ("Beautiful Alliance")
Belle Chasse ("Beautiful Hunting")
Belle d'Eau
Belle Rose ("Beautiful Rose")
Belmont
Bienville Parish
Blanchard (named after a Louisiana governor of French ancestry)
Bonnet Carré, flood prevention spillway on the Mississippi River ("square bonnet")
Bossier City (after Pierre Bossier)
Bossier Parish
Bourg (ancient French word for "town")
Breaux Bridge
Breton National Wildlife Refuge (on and around Breton Island)
Broussard (after merchant Valsin Broussard, of Acadian descent)
Butte La Rose
Calcasieu
Cancienne
Chalmette ("Pasture land, fallow land")
Chandeleur Islands
Charenton (named after Charenton asylum)
Chataignier ("Chestnut tree")
Chauvin 
Chenier Au Tigre ("Tiger oak tree")
Chenal
Cocodrie (dialect word for "crocodile")
Cossinade 
Coteau Bourgeois ("Bourgeois hill")
Davant
Delacroix Island
Delcambre
Des Allemands ("of the Germans")
Destrehan (named in honor of Jean Noel Destréhan, Creole politician)
Deville
Dulac ("of the lake")
Evangeline Parish
Faubourg Marigny New Orleans neighborhood
Faubourg Tremé New Orleans neighborhood
Fontainebleau New Orleans neighborhood
Fort De La Boulaye
Garyville
Gentilly New Orleans neighborhood
Grand Bayou ("great bayou")
Grand Ecaille ("great scale")
Grand Ecore
Grand Isle ("great island")
Grand Chenier ("great oakwood")
Grand Coteau ("great hill")
Grosse Isle ("big island")
Grand Point 
Grand Prairie ("great meadow")
Grosse Tête ("fat or big head")
Gueydan
Iberville Parish
Iberville Projects New Orleans neighborhood
Jean Lafitte (named for Jean Lafitte, a famous pirate)
Labadieville
Lacamp
Lacassine ("small house")
LaCour
Lacombe
Lafayette (named for the Marquis de La Fayette)
Lafitte Projects New Orleans neighborhood
Lafourche Parish (from la fourche, referring to a forked path)
Lake Borgne ("one-eyed")
Lake Pontchartrain
L'Anse Grise ("the gray cove")
LaPlace (named for early settler Basile LaPlace.)
Larose ("the rose")
Lebeau ("the beautiful")
Le Blanc ("the white")
Lecompte
Leonville
Le Moyen
Loreauville 
Marchand
Mandeville (named for developer Bernard Xavier de Marigny de Mandeville)
Maringouin (Cajun French in origin and means "mosquito")
Marion (named after an American soldier of huguenot ancestry)
Maurepas
Meaux (after the town of Meaux)
Meraux
Mermentau
Mer Rouge ("red sea")
Metairie (from a French word for sharecropping)
Michoud New Orleans neighboorhood
Montegut
Montpelier
Moreauville
Napoleonville (for French Emperor Napoleon Bonaparte)
New Orleans (named for the duke of Orléans, France)
Ossun (named after the town of Ossun)
Paincourtville ("short of bread town")
Paradis ("Paradise")
Parlange
Pierre Part
Plaisance
Plaquemines Parish
Plaucheville
Point Au Fer Reef Light
Pointe aux Chenes ("Oak Point")
Pointe à la Hache ("Axe Spike")
Pointe Coupee Parish (from pointe coupée, "cut spike")
Port Barre
Port Fourchon
Pont Des Mouton
Prairieville ("meadow town")
Presquille (from presqu'île, "peninsula")
Provencal
Rosaryville
Saint Benedict
Saint Bernard
Saint Maurice
St. Amant
St. Claude New Orleans neighborhood
St. Francisville
St. Gabriel
St. Landry Parish
St. Malo
St. Martinville (originally named Poste des Attakapas-Atakapas Post)
St. Roch New Orleans neighborhood
St. Rose
Saline
South Vacherie
Terrebonne Parish ("Good Land")
Timbalier Island ("timpani player")
Tulane/Gravier New Orleans neighborhood named after Paul Tulane, philanthropist and son of Louis Tulane, a French immigrant
Vacherie ("Cowshed")
Verdun
Versailles
Vieux Carré ("Old Square") also known as the French Quarter in New Orleans
Ville Platte ("Flat City")

Maine
Maine (one theory suggests the state was named after the historic French province of Maine)
Cadillac Mountain (named after explorer Antoine de la Mothe Cadillac)
Calais (after Calais, France)
Caribou
Castine
Deblois
Detroit
Fayette
Fort Pentagouet
Grand Isle
Isle au Haut
Lagrange
Lamoine
Minot
Montville
Mount Desert Island
Paris
Presque Isle (from the French word "presqu'île" meaning "peninsula"--- from presque meaning "almost", and isle meaning "island". The town is surrounded on three sides by water, and therefore is "almost an island")
Portage Lake
Roque Bluffs
Saint Croix Island
St. Francis River
Saint John River
Tremont

Maryland
Bel Air ("Good Air")
Havre de Grace  (named after Le Havre (originally Le Havre de Grâce, literally "haven of grace"), France)

Massachusetts
Barre
Belmont
Marion
Orleans (named for Louis Philippe II, Duke of Orléans)
Revere (after Paul Revere, of Huguenot ancestry; his family name originally was Rivoire)
Savoy

Michigan
Allouez (named after missionary Claude-Jean Allouez)
Au Gres (French for "at the sandstone")
Au Sable
Au Sable River
Au Train
Barbeau
Beaugrand Township
Belle River
Belleville ("Beautiful City;" named for a Paris district)
Bellevue
Benzie County "Bec Scie", meaning "Saw Beak" or "Saw Bill", a kind of duck
Berrien County
Bete Grise ("Gray Beast")
Bete Grise (community also meaning "Gray Beast")
Bois Blanc Island ("White Wood")
Cadillac (named after explorer Antoine de la Mothe Cadillac)
Chapin Township
Charlevoix (named for Pierre François Xavier de Charlevoix (1682–1761), a French Jesuit in New France)
Cheviers
Delaware Township
De Tour Village
Detroit (of the "Strait")
Doty
Eau Claire
Ecorse (from Rivière aux Écorces, "Bark River")
Fort Gratiot Charter Township
Fremont Township
Grand Blanc ("Great/Large White")
Grand Marais ("Large Marsh")
Grand Traverse County
Grande Pointe
Gratiot County
Grosse Ile ("Big Island")
Grosse Pointe ("Big Point")
Grosse Pointe Farms
Grosse Pointe Park
Grosse Pointe Shores
Grosse Pointe Woods
Hamtramck (named for the French-Canadian soldier Jean François Hamtramck from Québec, became a decorated officer in the American Revolutionary War)
Isle Royale National Park ("Royal Island")
Lac La Belle ("Beautiful Lake", community)
Lac La Belle ("Beautiful Lake", lake)
Lachine
Lamotte Township
L'Anse ("The Cove")
Lapeer County
Lasalle
LeRoy ("The King")
Les Cheneaux Islands ("The Channels")
Marion Township
Marlette
Marne (named after a river in France)
Marquette (named after explorer Jacques Marquette)
Marquette County
Montcalm County (named for Louis-Joseph de Montcalm, French military commander in the French and Indian War).
Montmorency County (named for the Montmorency family, a noble family influential in the administration of New France)
Napoleon (for Napoleon Bonaparte)
Parisville
Pere Marquette River (for Father (père) Jacques Marquette)
Pere Marquette Township
Pointe Aus Barques
Pointe aux Tremble
Pointe Mouillee State Game Area
Portage
Presque Isle (from presqu'île, "peninsula")
Presque Isle County
Reno Township
River Rouge
Saint Clair Haven
Saint Clair Shores
Sans Souci
Sault Ste. Marie ("St. Mary's Rapids")
Sebille Manor
St. Clair
St. Clair County
St. Clair Shores
St. Ignace (French rendition of St. Ignatius)
St. Joseph
Traverse City
Vermilion
Vermontville

Minnesota
Albertville, named after a city in France
Argyle (from the French Argile, "clay") (or from Argyll in Scotland?)
Audubon
Baudette
Beaulieu
Belle Plaine 
Belle Prairie Township
Bernadotte
Big Fork River (originally Rivière Grande Fourche)
Bois de Sioux River ("woods of the Sioux")
Bois Forte Indian Reservation ("hard wood")
Brule River (from the Ojibwe name Wiisakode-ziibi "half-burned wood river", which was translated directly into French as Bois Brulé. Half of the river disappears into a pothole in the Judge C. R. Magney State Park).
Calumet
Cloquet
Coteau des Prairies ("slope of the prairies")
Delano (after a scion of the famous Delano Family, originally Huguenots named "De Lannoye")
Detroit Lakes ("narrows lake")
Duluth (named after Daniel Greysolon, Sieur du Lhut)
Faribault
Faribault County, named for Jean-Baptiste Faribault, French-Canadian trader
Fond du Lac Indian Reservation ("source of the lake")
Frontenac State Park
Frontier  ("Border" refers to its position on the Minnesota / Ontario border)
Gentilly
Glese  (From the French "glaise" or clay)
Grand Marais ("Big Marsh"; some speculate "Big Harbor" in founders' accent)
Grand Portage ("Large Portage")
Grand Rapids
Hennepin County (named in honor of the 17th-century Belgian explorer Father Louis Hennepin)
Huot, Minnesota named after French-Canadian settler Louis Huot 
La Moille - corruption of La Mouette 'the seagull' from a Vermont city name
La Porte  (The Door)
La Prairie
Lac qui Parle ("lake that speaks")
La Crescent
Lac Vieux Desert ("lake of the old clearing")
Lake Pepin named after French-Canadian settler Jean Pepin
Lake Traverse
La Salle (named for René-Robert Cavelier, Sieur de La Salle, a french explorer)
Le Roy
Le Sueur (named for Pierre-Charles Le Sueur)
Leech Lake (originally lac sangsue, "leech lake", a translation from the Ojibwe Ozagaskwaajimekaag-zaaga'igan "Lake abundant with leeches")
Little Fork River (originally Rivière Petite Fourche)
Little Marais (originally Petit Marais, "Little Marsh")
Mille Lacs County
Mille Lacs Lake ("thousand lakes")
Nicollet County
Orleans
Pelland
Platte
Pomme de Terre ("potato")
Red Lake (originally lac rouge, "red lake", a translation from the Ojibwe Miskwaagamiiwi-zaaga'igan "Red-colored Waters Lake")
Rainy Lake (originally lac à la pluie, "rainy lake")
Renville County, Minnesota
Roseau ("reed")
Roseville
St. Cloud (named after a Paris suburb; St.Cloud is Saint Clodoald, grandson of the Frankish king Clovis I)
St. Croix River
St. Hilaire
St. Louis Park
Saint Paul (once known as Pig's Eye Landing after Pierre "Pig's Eye" Parrant - French: l'Oeil du Cochon, a French-Canadian trader and innkeeper, renamed Saint Paul by French-Canadian pastor Lucien Galtier when he built the first Roman Catholic chapel in the area)
Sedan (named after the french city of the same name)
Terrebonne ("good land")
Traverse County
Vadnais Heights, suburb of Saint Paul
Lake Vermilion
Voyageurs National Park, (named after the French-Canadian explorers - "travellers")

Mississippi
Abbeville
Amite County (from amitié, "friendship")
Bay St. Louis (from Baie Saint-Louis)
Bayou Caddy
Bellefontaine
Belmont
Benoit
Biloxi
Bourbon
Carriere
Centreville (note the "re" spelling in "centre" as opposed to "center")
Clermont Harbor
Decatur
De Lisle
D'Iberville (named after Pierre Lemoyne, Sieur d'Iberville, governor of New France)
Dumas
Fayette
Gautier (Named for the Gautier family, who established a homestead on the site in 1867.)
LeFleur's Bluff State Park (Named after earlier French-Canadian trader and settler Louis Lafleur)
Macon
Marion
Pass Christian (Named after Nicholas Christian L'Adnier)
Petit Bois Island ("Little Woods")
Saucier
Sartinville
St. Martin

Missouri
Audrain County
Auxvasse
Bay de Charles
Bayouville
Belgique
Belle
Bellefontaine
Bevier
Bonne Terre
Bourbeuse River
Bourbon
Brazeau
Cap au Gris
Cape Girardeau
Cape Girardeau County
Carondelet
Castor River
Chamois
Chariton County
Chouteau Springs
Courtois
Courtois Creek
Courtois Hills
Creve Coeur ("Heartbreak")
Cuivre River ("copper")
Dardenne Prairie
DeBaliviere Place (Neighborhood in St. Louis)
Des Arc
Desloge
Des Peres
River Des Peres
Fayette
Femme Osage
Florissant (formerly Fleurissant)
Frontenac
Gasconade County (from the French word "gascon" which in this context means braggart)
Gravois Mills
LaBarque Creek
La Belle
Laclede
Laclede County (named for Pierre Laclede (1729–1778), founder of St. Louis, Missouri)
Lafayette County (named for Gilbert du Motier, the Marquis de Lafayette)
La Forge
La Grange
Lake Lafayette
La Tour
La Vieille Mine (Alternate name of Old Mines)
Le Grand Village Sauvage
Loutre River
Lyon
Macon County
Marais Croche
Marais des Cygnes River
Marais des Liards (original name of Bridgeton)
Marais Temps Clair
Maries County From "Marais" meaning swamp.
Marion County
Maupin
Mine La Motte
Metz (named for the city in France)
Moniteau County
Moreau River
Noel
Normandy
Oregon County "Ouragon" meaning hurricane
Ozark County "Aux Arcs"
Papin
Paris
Pere Marquette Park
Petit Marais Rondeau Lake
Platte County
Pomme de Terre Lake ("Potato")
Pomme de Terre River ("Potato")
Portage des Sioux
Portageville
Prairie du Chien
River aux Vases
Robidoux
Roubidoux Creek
Rocheport
St. Aubert
St. Charles
St. Charles County
St. Clair County
St. Cloud
St. Francois County
St. Francois Mountains
St. Louis (named in honor of King Louis IX, later canonized as Saint Louis)
St. Louis County
Ste. Genevieve (after the patron saint of Paris)
Ste. Genevieve County
Terre du Lac
Theabeau
Valles Mines
Versailles
Vichy

Montana
Anceney and Anceney Bridge, Montana, named after Charles Leon Ancen(n)ey (Anxionnaz)(1826-1895)
Belle Creek community (and Belle Creek river)
Cascade County ("waterfall")
Choteau
Chouteau County, named after Pierre Chouteau, Jr., an American fur trader of French Canadian origin
Dupuyer
Froid ("Cold")
Gallatin County
Havre (from Le Havre, France)
Joliet
Laurin
Lozeau
Portage
Prairie County
St. Marie
St. Xavier
Sonnette
Teton County ("Teat")
Valmy (from Valmy, France)
Virgelle
Wibaux County

Nebraska
Barada (named after Antoine Barada, whose father was French fur trapper and interpreter Michel Barada)
Bayonne (named for the city)
Bellevue  ("Beautiful Sight")
Bordeaux  (named for the creek, below)
Bordeaux Creek (named for a fur trader)
Cabanné's Post
Chadron, Nebraska
Decatur
Du Bois ("of the Woods")
Fontanelle, Fontenelle Forest, Fontenelle Boulevard, Hotel Fontenelle, Logan Fontenelle Housing Project (Named after Logan Fontenelle, Omaha Tribe chief who was the son of a Creole and Omahan mother)
Fremont (named for John C. Frémont, French-American pioneer and politician)
Grand Island
La Platte
Loup County, Loup River ("Wolf", named after the Skidi Pawnee people who called themselves the Wolf People)
Louisville
Loup River
Lyons
Papillion (from papillon, "butterfly")
Platte County
Platte River ("flat river")
Robidoux Pass
Sarpy County (named after Peter Abadie Sarpy, a fur trader of French origin born in New Orleans, Louisiana)
St. Deroin (named after a family called Du Roins).
St. Paul

Nevada
Frenchman
Frenchman Flat
Lamoille
Montreux
Pioche, named after François Louis Alfred Pioche, a financier who purchased the town in 1869.
Primeaux
Reno, named after Major General Jesse Lee Reno, a Union officer killed in the American Civil War. (Reno's family name was a modified version of the French surname "Renault")
Valmy, named after the place in France of a famous battle during the Revolutionary period.

New Hampshire
Belmont (named for August Belmont, German-born financier who changed his name to Belmont upon arriving in the United States)
Bretton Woods 
Fremont (named for John C. Frémont, French-American pioneer and politician)
Pinardville (named for Edmond Pinard, Québec native and early resident)

New Jersey
New Jersey and Jersey City (after the Bailliage de Jersey, the largest of the Anglo-Norman Channel Islands near the coast of northwest France)
Audubon
Bayonne (according to tradition, from Bayonne, France)
Belleplain
Belleville ("Beautiful town")
Lavallette (named for Elie A. F. La Vallette, U.S. naval captain of French family origin)
Port Liberté ("Freedom Port")
Montclair ("Bright Mountain")

New Mexico
Bayard (named for George Dashiell Bayard, Union general in the Civil War of French ancestry)
Clovis (named for Clovis, first Christian King of the Franks)
Lamy, New Mexico (named for the French born and educated Santa Fe, New Mexico Archbishop Jean-Baptiste Lamy (1814 - 1888)
Ledoux, New Mexico (named for Abraham Ledoux (1784-1842) and Antoine Ledoux (1779 - ?), two French brothers born in Québec, who became trappers and settled in Mora, New Mexico and Taos, New Mexico)
Antoine Leroux, New Mexico (named for Antoine Leroux (1801 - 1861), a famous trader and scout, born from French - Canadian parents, who settled in Taos, New Mexico)
St. Vrain, New Mexico (named for Ceran St. Vrain (1802 - 1870), a Western American trader of French descent.

New York
Au Sable, New YorkAu Sable
Ausable River ("sand river")
Barre
Bellerose
Belle Terre
Boquet or Bouquet River
Buffalo (One theory holds that the city gets its name from an English corruption of the French "beau fleuve" ("beautiful river").)
Chateaugay (named after Chateauguay, Québec)
Chateaugay River
Champlain (named after French explorer Samuel de Champlain)
Chaumont
Chaumont Bay
Chaumont River
Chazy
Clermont
Decatur
Delaware County
Dunkirk (named after the city of Dunkirk or Dunkerque, France, because of the similar harbor.)
Esperance
Fayette
Fayetteville
Fremont
Fremont Center (named after John C. Frémont, Franco-American explorer, military officer and politician)
Gouverneur
Grand Island
Granville
Grasse River (named after the Comte de Grasse, a French admiral who decisively defeated the British fleet in the Battle of the Chesapeake in September 1781 during the American Revolution)
Huguenot
Jacques Cartier State Park (park located along the St. Lawrence River and named after 16th-century French explorer Jacques Cartier)
La Chute River
LaFayette
LaGrange
Lake Champlain (lake named after French explorer Samuel de Champlain)
Le Ray
Le Roy
Liberty Island (after the Statue de la Liberté offered by France)
Lorraine
Louisville
Maine
Marion
Massena (named after André Masséna, one of Napoleon's field marshals.)
Montague
Montour
New Paltz (named by French Huguenots)
New Rochelle (founded by French Huguenots and named after La Rochelle, France.)
Orleans
Orleans County
Portage
Raquette River
Rouses Point (named after early settler Jacques Rouse.)
Point Au Roche State Park (park located on the shores of Lake Champlain)
St. Armand
St. Lawrence County (for the Saint Lawrence River, English form of Fleuve Saint-Laurent.)
Valcour Island (island located in Lake Champlain)

North Carolina
Belvoir
Camp Lejeune US Marine Corps base ("The Youth" or "The Young Man")
Charlotte
Fayetteville
Faison
Fremont
La Grange
Lenoir
Lenoir County
Peletier

North Dakota
Almont
Belcourt
Bois de Sioux River
Bordulac ("Edge of the Lake")
Bottineau (named for Pierre Bottineau, Métis pioneer, hunter, and trapper)
Cavalier (from "chevalier", knight)
Charbonneau
Chateau de Mores State Historic Site (home and ranch built in the 1880s by the French cattle baron and nobleman Marquis de Morès)
Missouri Coteau
Coulee
De Lamere
Des Lacs River("of the Lakes"), also Des Lacs
Gascoyne (from the French region "Gascogne")
Grand Forks (from the French "les Grandes Fourches" or the great forks)
Grandin (named after French-Canadian Bishop Grandin)
Granville (from "grand" = big, "ville" = city)
Joliette (maybe from "jolie" = pretty)
LaMoure
Medora (named by the French nobleman Marquis de Morès for his wife Medora)
Merricourt
Montpelier (named after Montpellier, France)
Napoleon (named after French Emperor Napoleon Bonaparte)
Renville County
Rolette
Russo Original family named Rousseau
Verendrye (named for Pierre de La Vérendrye, French-Canadian officer and explorer)
Voltaire (named for Voltaire, French Enlightenment philosopher)

Ohio
Auglaize River (corruption of the French eau glaise, meaning "muddy water")
Auglaize County
Belfort (named for a town in France)
Bellaire
Bellefontaine ("Beautiful Fountain")
Bellevue ("Beautiful View")
Belmont County  (Anglicized "Beautiful Mountain")
Belmont
Belpre ("Beautiful Meadow")
Champaign County
Chardon
Cheviot
Clermont County (from the city Clermont, France. "Clair" = clear, "mont" = mount)
Conneaut
Decatur
Delaware County
Duchouquet Township
Fayette County (after the Marquis de Lafayette)
Fayette
Fremont
Gallia County (Latin for Gaul, Roman name for France)
Gallipolis, Ohio, largest city of Gallia County
Girard
Grand Prairie Township
Guernsey County
Huron County (French name for the Wyandot tribe)
Lafayette
Lagrange ("The Barn")
LaRue ("The Street")
Leroy Township, Lake County ("The King")
Lorain County (for the French province of Lorraine)
Lorain
Louisville
Marietta (to honor Marie Antoinette)
Marion County
Marne (named after a river in France)
Marseilles (from the French city of Marseille)
Martel ("Hammer")
Massillon (after Jean Baptiste Massillon, French bishop)
Moraine
Oregon
Paris Township, Portage County, Ohio
Paris Township, Stark County, Ohio
Paris Township, Union County, Ohio
Portage County
Vermilion River  (Red River)
Versailles

Oklahoma
Achille ("Achilles")
Avant ("Before" or "ahead")
Ballard (a common French surname)
Belfonte
Bellevue ("Beautiful View")
Boise City (from Boisé, "Wooded")
Cache
Chouteau
Delaware County
Durant (The French surname of the town's founding French/Choctaw family)
El Reno (Named after Civil War officer Jesse L. Reno - descended from "Renault")
Guymon
Lucien (A common French given name)
Poteau ("Stake")
Remy
Sans Bois Mountains ("Without forest")
Verdigris "Green Gray"
Verdigris River

Oregon
Oregon (possibly from "le fleuve aux ouragans", French for "river of the hurricanes", referring to the windiness of the Columbia River)
Bonneville (named after Benjamin Louis Eulalie de Bonneville (1796–1878), a French-born officer in the United States Army, fur trapper, and explorer)
Charbonneau (named after Jean-Baptiste Charbonneau son of Sacajawea and Toussaint Charbonneau a French-Canadian trapper member of the Lewis & Clark expedition)
Coquille ("Shell")
Deschutes County ("of the falls")
Deschutes River (from rivière des chutes meaning river of the falls)
Deschutes National Forest (Waterfalls National Forest)
Detroit ("Strait")
Gervais (A French given name)
Grand Ronde ("Big ring")
Lafayette
La Grande ("The Big / Great One")
Langlois (French surname. From "L'Anglais" = the Englishman)
La Pine ("The Pine")
Malheur County ("Misfortune")
Marion County
Maupin
Nonpareil ("Unparalleled")
Rainier
Ruch ("Hive")
Saint Louis
Saint Paul
Sauvie Island
Terrebonne ("Good ground")
The Dalles (from les dalles meaning "slabs" or possibly a type of rapids)
Willamette River (French pronunciation of a Clackamas Indian village name)
Willamette Valley

Pennsylvania
Belle Vernon
Bellefonte ("Beautiful Fountain")
Bellevue
Boquet
Calumet, Pennsylvania
Charleroi ("Charles King"—in reference to King Carlos II of Spain)
Chartiers
Dauphin County
Decatur Township
Delano (after a scion of the famous Delano Family, originally Huguenots named "De Lannoye")
DuBois ("Of the Woods")
Duquesne, named after the Marquis Duquesne, governor of New France
Eau Claire
Fayette City
Fayette County, named to honor the Marquis de LaFayette
Fort Duquesne, original name of what is now Pittsburgh
Fort Le Boeuf
Fort Machault
Fort Presque Isle
Laporte ("The door")
Ligonier, named after Field Marshal John Ligonier, a British noble and officer with French ancestry
Luzerne County
Luzerne Township
Mercer
Montour County
North Versailles
Paris
South Versailles
Versailles, named after the Palace of Versailles
Wilkes-Barre (Barre was a British politician with Huguenot ancestry, favorable to the cause of US colonies)

Rhode Island
Lafayette Village, a historic district in North Kingstown, RI
Louisquisset, a neighborhood and major parkway in Providence, RI
Marieville, a neighborhood in Providence, RI

South Carolina
Abbeville (from Abbeville, France)
Abbeville County, South Carolina
Bonneau (from bonne eau, "good water")
Bordeaux (from Bordeaux, France)
DeBordieu
Eau Claire ("Clear Water")
Fort Motte
Gaston (A common French given name)
Gourdin
La France
Pacolet
Port Royal Sound
Ravenel
Sans Souci ("No Worries", the French name of chateau of Frederick the Great, famously Francophile)
Turbeville
Vaucluse (from the Vaucluse, France)

South Dakota
Belle Fourche  ("Beautiful Fork")
Belle Fourche Reservoir
Belle Fourche River
Big Sioux River
Bois de Sioux River ("Woods of the Sioux" River)
Bon Homme County  ("Good Man" County)
Burdette
Conde (maybe from the noble French family of Condé)
Corsica
Coteau des Prairies  ("Slope of the Prairies")
Missouri Coteau  ("Slope of the Missouri")
East Sioux Falls, a ghost town
Edgemont
De Smet, named for Pierre-Jean De Smet, a Belgian priest
Dupree (maybe from "du pré")
Flandreau, named for Charles Eugene Flandrau, judge of Huguenot ancestry
Fort Pierre
Jerauld County
Joubert (a common French surname)
Lake Traverse
La Plant
LeBeau
Mellette County
Montrose (possibly from "pink mountain")
Moreau River
North Sioux City
Pierpont
Pierre, named for Pierre Chouteau, Jr., an American fur trader of French Canadian origin
Platte
Roubaix, a ghost town named for the French city of the same name
Roubaix Lake, a lake located in the Black Hills (from the French city of Roubaix)
St. Francis
Sioux Falls
Vermillion
West Branch Lac qui Parle River ("Lake that Speaks" River)

Tennessee
Decatur
Decatur County
Decaturville
Fayette County
Gallatin
Lafayette
La Follette
La Grange
La Vergne
Lenoir City (named for William Lenoir, Revolutionary War general of Huguenot ancestry, and his son)
Macon
Macon County
Marion County
Paris
Sevier County
Sevierville (named for John Sevier, Tennessee governor of Huguenot ancestry)

Texas
 Austin-named for Stephen F. Austin, whose surname is of Norman French origin.
Bayou Vista
Biloxi
Blanchard
Burnet County (named after early Texas leader David Gouverneur Burnet)
Castroville (founded by Henri Castro, a French diplomat)
Colmesnil
Crockett County (Davy Crockett's ancestors were Huguenots named Croquetagne, one of whom was captain in the Royal Guard of Louis XIV)
Dallardsville
DeBerry
Decatur
Doucette
Dumas, named after its founder Louis Dumas
Duval County
Fayette County (named after the Marquis de Lafayette)
Gary City
Grand Prairie
LaBelle
La Grange (named after the Marquis de Lafayette's chateau)
La Marque
La Porte ("The Door")
La Salle County (named after explorer René-Robert Cavelier, Sieur de La Salle)
Lamar County (named after early Texas leader Mirabeau Buonaparte Lamar)
Marion County
Mauriceville
Menard
Menard County
Mont Belvieu
Montague County
Paris

Utah
Ballard
Bonneville Salt Flats (named after Benjamin Louis Eulalie de Bonneville (1796–1878), a French-born officer in the United States Army, fur trapper and explorer)
Cache County
Cache Junction
Duchesne
Duchesne County
Fayette
Fort Duchesne
Grand County
Henrieville
Lapoint
Portage
Provo (named after Étienne Provost)
Sevier County
Sevier
St. George

Vermont
Vermont (originally Vert Mont, or "Green Mountain")
Barre ("Barred")
Belmont
Calais
Grand Isle County ("big island")
Isle La Motte
Jay Peak (named after John Jay, whose family was of French Huguenot origin)
Lake Champlain
Lamoille (corruption of the name La Mouette 'the seagull' which began when a map maker failed to cross the t's)
Montpelier (named after Montpellier, France)
Orleans County
Orleans (named after Orléans, France)
Vergennes

Virginia
Amissville
Barboursville
Basye
Bavon
Belmont
Belle Isle State Park
Belvoir
Bertrand (A common French given name)
Boissevain
Bon Air
Botetourt County
Capron
Caret
Cedon
Champlain
Chantilly, named after Chantilly, France
Clary
Crozet
Delaplane
Fauquier County
Fort Belvoir ("see well")
Fremont
La Crosse
Lagrange
Macon
Manquin
Mauzy
Montpelier
Orlean
Paris
Raphine
Renan
Richmond, from "riche mont", a name given first to the castle founded in North Yorkshire by a Breton family, and from there to Richmond near London
Rochelle
Sabot
Turbeville

Washington
Beaux Arts Village (from "fine arts")
Bellevue ("Beautiful View")
Belfair
Belmont ("Beautiful Mountain")
Blanchard (Old French for "Whitish")
Boistfort
Brier
Coulee City
Coupeville
Decatur Island
Deschutes ("of the Falls")
Des Moines ("of the Monks")
Doty
Dupont
Duvall
Esperance ("Hope")
Fauntleroy (Old French for "Child of the King")
Guerrier ("Warrior")
Grand Coulee (from coulée or couler, meaning "to flow")
La Center
La Crosse
La Grande
Lamont
La Push (Clallam County, along the Quileute River on the Olympic Peninsula. Home to the Quileute Indian Tribe. From la bouche, meaning "mouth", as infused into Chinook trading jargon)
Laurier (Named after Sil Wilfrid Laurier, Canadian Prime Minister)
Loup Loup (from loup, "wolf")
Malo
Maury Island
Mount Rainier (named after Captain Peter Rainier, grandson of the Huguenot refugee Daniel Regnier)
Normandy (named after Normandy, France)
North Bonneville (named after Benjamin Louis Eulalie de Bonneville (1796–1878), a French-born officer in the United States Army, fur trapper, and explorer)
Ozette
Palouse (from pelouse, meaning "lawn")
Pend Oreille County (named after the Pend d'Oreilles tribe. French for "earring" and a reference to heavy earrings and distended lobes of the people of the same name)
Pomeroy (Old French for "Apple Orchard")
Portage
Portage Island
Puget Sound named after Peter Puget, an officer in the Royal Navy of Huguenot descent
Quimper Peninsula
Roche Harbor
Touchet
Touchet River
Vashon
Vashon Island named after James Vashon, an officer in the Royal Navy of Huguenot descent

West Virginia
Bayard
Belle
Belmont
Despard
Fayette
Fayette County
Fayetteville
Granville
Guyandotte River (a river in southern West Virginia, running from Wyoming County near Beckley, to the Ohio River near Huntington. Guyandotte is the French spelling of the name of an Indian tribe also known as the Wyandot.)
Marion County
Montcalm (named for Louis-Joseph de Montcalm, French military commander in the French and Indian War).
Ronceverte (Name is derived from two words meaning "Greenbrier.")

Wisconsin
Wisconsin (anglicized from the French "Ouisconsin", which in turn is a corruption of the Ojibwe "Meskonsing")
Allouez (after Claude-Jean Allouez)
Apple River (corruption of the French Rivière Pomme de Terre des Cygnes, which in turn is a translation from the Ojibwe Waabiziipinikaani-ziibi, "River abundant with swan potatoes")
Argonne (from the Argonne Forest in France)
Ballou
Belle Plaine ("beautiful plain")
Bellevue ("beautiful view")
Benoit
Bois Brule River  ("burnt wood")
Butte des Morts ("hill of the dead")
Calumet County (French for Menominee peace pipe)
Cassel (a town in France)
Couderay (from lac courte oreilles, "short ears")
Dell Prairie
De Pere (from les rapides des pères, "the rapids of the fathers")
Dovre
Eau Claire ("clear water")
Eau Claire County
Eau Galle  ("gall water")
Eau Pleine  ("full water")
Flambeau ("torch")
Fond du Lac ("bottom of the lake")
Fond du Lac County
Grand Chute ("great fall")
Green Bay (anglicized from the French baie verte, previously "Baie des Puants" - "Bay of Stinks")
Juneau County ("Named for Solomon Juneau, born in Quebec")
La Crosse ("the crozier")
La Crosse County
La Farge
Lafayette County
La Grange (originally "La Grane" after the native place of General La Fayette)
La Pointe (from la pointe de Chequamegon, the area around Chequamegon Bay)
La Valle ("the valley")
Lac Courte Oreilles ("lake short ears")
Lac du Flambeau ("lake of the torch")
Lac La Belle ("Lake the beautiful or beautiful lake")
Lake Butte des Morts ("hill of the dead")
Langlade County
Marinette County
Marquette (after Father Jacques Marquette)
Marquette County
Montreal  ("Royal Mountain", after Montréal, Québec)
Nicolet National Forest (after Jean Nicolet)
Pepin County
Portage (originally named for the Fox-Wisconsin portage)
Portage County
Prairie du Chien ("dog prairie")
Prairie du Sac ("prairie of the Sac people")
Presque Isle (from presqu'île, "peninsula")
Racine ("root", after the Root River)
Racine County
Radisson ("radish")
Roche a Cri
St. Croix Falls (after the St. Croix ("Holy Cross") river, named c. 1689)
St. Croix County
Superior (from Lake Superior / Lac Supérieur - meaning "upper" in this context)
Theresa
Trempealeau River (from "trempe à l'eau", "plunge into the water")
Trempealeau County

Wyoming
Belle Fourche River
Bondurant
Calpet
Cheyenne (from the French pronunciation and spelling of the Dakota word Sahi'yena, a diminutive of Sahi'ya, a Dakotan name for the Cree people.)
Cheyenne River
Dubois (named after U.S. Senator Fred Dubois, of French-Canadian ancestry)
Fontenelle
Fort Laramie
Fremont County (named for John C. Frémont, French-American pioneer and politician)
Grand Teton National Park (from French grands tétons'', "large teats" - presumably referring to the mountains' shape)
Gros Ventre Range
Gros Ventre River
La Barge
La Grange
Laramie (named from Jacques LaRamie, a French-speaking Canadian trapper who disappeared in the Laramie Mountains in the late 1810s)
Laramie County
Laramie Mountains
Laramie River
Little Laramie River, as well as the North, South, and Middle Fork Laramie Rivers
North Laramie River
North Platte River
Platte County
Ranchettes
Rozet
Sublette County
Teton County
Teton Range
Teton Village

U.S. Virgin Islands
Saint Croix ("Holy Cross")

See also 
 List of U.S. state name etymologies
 Lists of U.S. county name etymologies
 List of place names of German origin in the United States
 List of U.S. place names of Spanish origin
 List of Chinook Jargon placenames
 List of non-US places that have a US place named after them

References

External links

French-American history
French
French language in the United States